Impatience is a lack of patience.

Impatience may also refer to:

 Impatience, an album by Faye Wong, Chinese title: Fuzao
 "Impatience", a song from Brain Thrust Mastery by We Are Scientists
 "Impatience", an episode of Death Note

See also
 Impatiens, a genus of flowers